Lashgargah (also Romanized as Lashgargāh; also known as Lashkargāh) is a village in Makvan Rural District, Bayangan District, Paveh County, Kermanshah Province, Iran. At the 2006 census, its population was 125, in 29 families.

References 

Populated places in Paveh County